Patardzeuli, is a village in Eastern Georgia, in Sagarejo District, of Kakheti Region, located about 50 kilometers from Tbilisi, the capital.

It was known in the past mainly because was the home-town of the Georgian writer Giorgi Leonidze, to whom the public school is still dedicated.

Currently, Patardzeuli is known for his beautiful surroundings, especially on the north side, bordering the Mariamjvari Strict Nature Reserve, and because hosts two big schools: the above-mentioned public school, and the "Lyceum" Tsissière-Dirmelachvili (founded in 1996) where the students of the region have the opportunity to be initiated at the European languages (mainly French and English) and culture.

Such schools are frequented every day from hundreds of students, and both have a park, are equipped with basic IT infrastructure, and offer a vegetarian canteen to all students and teachers.

History

An episode during the II World War 
According to the "annales" of Patardzeuli,
written in French and deposited in the
Museum of the "Lyceum" Tsissière-Dirmelachvili
(see above), during the year 1943, Giorgi Bilanichvili,
citizen of Patardzeuli, came back from the II World War,
in which was wounded, and was set up a grand ceremony,
involving all the personalities of the village.
During such ceremony, in which the above-mentioned
Giorgi Bilanichvili was declared hero of the soviet Union,
Lili Dgigaour,  student of the 8th class,  
gave an account of his life, and a concert in his honour
was held by the students: during such concert Giorgi
cried for the emotion.
At that time, Khetevan Dokhtourichvili is remembered as
teacher of Georgian language, and 
Kokrachvili as mayor of the village.
The city itself of Patardzeuli offered, during the
same period of war, hundreds of quintals of bread and medicinal 
plants to the soldiers.

See also
 Kakheti

References

Populated places in Kakheti
Tiflis Governorate